James Mabbe or Mab (1572–1642) was an English scholar, translator, and poet, and a Fellow of Magdalen College, Oxford. He was involved in translations from Spanish, notably of the Picaresque novel by Mateo Alemán, Guzmán de Alfarache, in 1622. He also translated some of the Novelas ejemplares of Miguel de Cervantes and, in 1631, Celestina, or the Tragicomedy of Calisto and Melibea, a 300-page play, or "novel in dialogue," by Fernando de Rojas.

James Mabbe may also be the "I. M." who wrote the fourth commendatory verse to the First Folio of Shakespeare's plays (1623), given that his friend and colleague Leonard Digges wrote the third.

Notes

1572 births
1642 deaths
Fellows of Magdalen College, Oxford
English translators
17th-century translators
17th-century English poets
17th-century English male writers
British Hispanists
English male poets